Henry Ferne (1602 – 16 March 1662) was an English bishop.

Life

Ferne was born in York.  He was educated at Uppingham School to which he was sent by Sir Thomas Nevill of Holt who had married his mother. He was admitted to St Mary Hall, Oxford, in 1618, and to Trinity College, Cambridge, in 1620. He graduated B.A. in 1623 and was elected fellow in 1624. He was awarded a D.D. at Cambridge in 1642. He became Chaplain Extraordinary to Charles I; Master of Trinity College, Cambridge, from 1660 to 1662; Dean of Ely, about 1662; Bishop of Chester, February 1662, and died in Chester five weeks after his consecration, on 16 March.

Works

He wrote many controversial pamphlets and was one of those who attacked James Harrington's book The Commonwealth of Oceana (1656).

References

The Master of Trinity at Trinity College, Cambridge
Samuel Pepys diary - 2 September 1660

1602 births
1662 deaths
Alumni of St Mary Hall, Oxford
Alumni of Trinity College, Cambridge
Masters of Trinity College, Cambridge
Archdeacons of Leicester
Bishops of Chester
Deans of Ely
Vice-Chancellors of the University of Cambridge
Clergy from York